Prasad Priyankara Wickramasinghe (born 12 May 1977) is a Sri Lankan-born cricketer who played for the Malaysia national cricket team, Bloomfield Cricket and Athletic Club,  Sri Lankan A team and the Sri Lankan Board XI.

Personal and early life
Priyankara was educated at Nalanda College, Colombo and played cricket for Nalanda College first XI team from 1994 to 1995 & former Sri Lanka cricket captain Mahela Jayawardene was his teammate.

Malaysian international career

Priyankara made his debut for Malaysia in 2008 against Singapore.

Notes

References

External links
 

1977 births
Cricketers from Colombo
Sri Lankan cricketers
Bloomfield Cricket and Athletic Club cricketers
Alumni of Nalanda College, Colombo
Living people
Malaysian cricketers
Sri Lankan emigrants to Malaysia
Sri Lankan expatriates in Malaysia